Labeobarbus pellegrini is a species of ray-finned fish in the genus Labeobarbus is endemic to the Lowa River in the Democratic Republic of the Congo.

References 

pellegrini
Fish described in 1948
Endemic fauna of the Democratic Republic of the Congo